Protodioscin is a steroidal saponin compound found in a number of plant species, most notably in the Tribulus, Trigonella Dioscorea and  Trillium families. It is best known as the putative active component of the herbal aphrodisiac plant Tribulus terrestris.

Extracts from T. terrestris standardised for protodioscin content have been demonstrated to produce proerectile effects in isolated tissues and aphrodisiac action in several animal species. It is thought protodioscin achieves this primarily through causing an increase in androgen receptor immunoreacivity, meaning it increases the concentration of androgen receptors in cells, causing the organism to become more sensitive to androgens like testosterone and dihydrotestosterone (DHT). The mechanism for these effects has not been clearly established, and while protodioscin has been demonstrated to trigger release of nitric oxide in corpus cavernosum tissue, and also to produce statistically significant increases in the levels of the hormones testosterone, dihydrotestosterone and dehydroepiandrosterone in animal studies, studies in humans have failed to show efficacy and its use remains controversial.

References 

Steroidal glycosides
Saponins